Tarczyn  is a town in central Poland, seat of Gmina Tarczyn, in the Piaseczno County, in Masovian Voivodeship, about  south of Warsaw. There were 3,869 inhabitants living there in 2004. This town became famous for the eponymous juices that were made there.

History

Tarczyn’s history reaches back to the 13th century, when a local trading–post and market was established close to the banks of a small river, known today as Tarczynka, thereby deriving its name from this river. Early documented references to the locality include: “Tarczin” (1284), Tarczyno (1303), Tarczyn (1353,1580), Tharczino (1355, 1241), Tarcynum (1634). Tarczyn was first mentioned in 1259. In 1353 the Mazovian Duke Casimir I gave the locality its Magdeburgian Town Charter and financed the founding of Gothic St. Nicolas’s church. Tarczyn was administratively located in the Masovian Voivodeship in the Greater Poland Province until the Third Partition of Poland in 1795, when it was annexed by Prussia. In 1807 it was regained by Poles and included within the short-lived Polish Duchy of Warsaw, and after its dissolution, in 1815, it passed to newly formed Congress Poland within the Russian Partition of Poland. It was deprived of its town rights by the Tsarist administration following the unsuccessful Polish January Uprising of 1863–1864. Poland eventually regained independence after World War I in 1918, and Tarczyn was restored to Poland.

During the joint German-Soviet invasion of Poland, which started World War II in September 1939, the town was invaded and then occupied by Germany until 1945. Many Poles joined the underground resistance movement. Notable local resistance members included the pre-war school principal Julian Stępkowski, who organized secret Polish schooling during the occupation, priest Czesław Oszkiel, who issued birth certificates with changed names to people in need, Mieczysław Kaczyński, who distributed underground Polish press, and apothecary Ewa Jeżewska, who fed hungry people, treated wounded Polish soldiers and insurgents, and hid them from the Germans. Stępkowski, Oszkiel and Kaczyński were captured and murdered by the Germans in 1943–1944. In 1945 the German occupation ended and the town was restored to Poland, although with a Soviet-installed communist regime, which remained in power until the Fall of Communism in the 1980s. Ewa Jeżewska, who survived the war, was harassed by the communists and deprived of her pharmacy.

Attractions
Tarczyn and its district have a few characteristic places like the forests and brushwoods, the picturesque tracts of woodlands, through which the river Jeziorka wends. Many tourist attractions: Tarczyn’s 16th-century church; the wooden church in Rembertów; the rustic, little chapels in Leśna Polana, in Przypki and in Werdun; studs of horses; Organic Farm in Kawęczyn; tourist farm in Przypki; past verdant, thick forests to the western part of the district; the Manor House at Many, where Złotopolscy daytime soap opera was filmed (with English subtitles, viewable on satellite TV).

Transport
Tarczyn is located along the Polish National road 7, and west of the S7 highway, part of the international European route E77, connecting Kraków, Kielce and Radom in the south with Warsaw and Gdańsk in the north. The nearest major airport is the Warsaw Chopin Airport.

Notable people
 Adam Franciszek Ksawery Rostkowski (1660–1738), Polish Catholic bishop, writer and translator; died in Tarczyn
 Irena Sendler (1910–2008), Polish war hero, humanitarian and nurse of the Polish resistance movement in World War II, head of the children's section of the Żegota, who rescued 2,500 Jewish children during the Holocaust, grew up in Tarczyn; honorary citizen of Tarczyn
 Jan Wróblewski, Polish brewer, founder of the Harbin Brewery, the oldest brewery in China

References

External links
 Jewish Community in Tarczyn on Virtual Shtetl

Cities and towns in Masovian Voivodeship
Piaseczno County
Masovian Voivodeship (1526–1795)
Warsaw Governorate
Warsaw Voivodeship (1919–1939)